A Sou'wester is a traditional form of collapsible oilskin rain hat that is longer in the back than the front to protect the neck fully.  A gutter front brim is sometimes featured.

See also
 Mariner's cap
 Oilcloth
 Waxed cotton

References

External links 
 

Headgear
Maritime culture
Sailing equipment